Chibelela is an administrative ward in the Bahi District of the Dodoma Region of Tanzania. According to the 2002 census, the ward has a total population of 8,787.

In 2016 the Tanzania National Bureau of Statistics report there were 10,904 people in the ward, from 10,033 in 2012. The ward has .

References

Wards of Dodoma Region